Srilankamyia is a genus of flies in the family Dolichopodidae. The genus is named after Sri Lanka, the country where the type species was collected. Species of this genus are also found in South China and Laos.

Species
 Srilankamyia argyrata Naglis, Grootaert & Wei, 2011
 Srilankamyia dividifolia Wei, 2013
 Srilankamyia guizhouensis (Wei, 1997)
 Srilankamyia lianmengi (Olejnicek, 2003)
 Srilankamyia proctus (Wei, 1997)
 Srilankamyia prolixa (Wei, 1997)

References

Dolichopodinae
Dolichopodidae genera
Diptera of Asia